This is a list of the main career statistics of former professional tennis player Chris Evert.

Significant finals

Grand Slam finals

Singles: 34 finals (18 titles, 16 runners-up)
Evert played in a total of 56 grand slams in her career.  She made records of 54 quarterfinals, 52 semifinals, and 34 finals.  She lost before the quarterfinals 2 times, both in the third round, at the 1983 Wimbledon where she lost to Kathy Jordan and at the 1988 French Open where she lost to Arantxa Sánchez Vicario.  Her 299 grand slam singles match wins is 3rd best in the Open Era.

Doubles: 4 finals (3 titles, 1 runner-up)

Mixed doubles: 1 final (1 runner-up)

Year-end championships finals

Singles: 8 (4 titles, 4 runners-up)

Grand Slam singles tournament timeline

Notes: 
The Australian Open was held twice in 1977, in January and December.
 Evert retired in September 1989 after playing in the U.S Open, at which time she was ranked world No.4.

WTA singles finals

Titles: (157)

Runner-ups: (73)

WTA Tour career earnings

Record against other top players
Evert's win–loss record against certain players who have been ranked World No. 10 or higher is as follows:

Players who have been ranked World No. 1 are in boldface.

 Virginia Wade 40–6
/ Martina Navratilova 37–43
 Evonne Goolagong 26–13
 Virginia Ruzici 24–0
 Sue Barker 23–1
 Betty Stöve 22–0
 Rosemary Casals 22–1
 Wendy Turnbull 21–1
/ Hana Mandlíková 21–7
 Pam Shriver 19–3
 Billie Jean King 19–7
 Kerry Reid 18–2
/ Manuela Maleeva 17–2
/ Helena Suková 17–2
 Andrea Jaeger 17–3
 Sylvia Hanika 16–1
 Dianne Fromholtz 16–3
 Olga Morozova 15–0
 Bettina Bunge 14–0
 Mima Jaušovec 14–0
 Françoise Dürr 13–0
 Claudia Kohde-Kilsch 13–0
 Bonnie Gadusek 12–0
 Kathy Jordan 12–3
 Carling Bassett-Seguso 9–0
 Jo Durie 9–0
 Kathy Rinaldi 9–0
 Zina Garrison 9–2
 Margaret Court 9–4
 Tracy Austin 8–9
 Barbara Potter 8–0
 Mary Joe Fernández 7–0
 Kathy Horvath 7–0
 Lisa Bonder 7–1
 Stephanie Rehe 6–0
 Greer Stevens 6–1
 Gabriela Sabatini 6–3
 Nancy Richey 6–5
 Steffi Graf 6–8
 Catarina Lindqvist 4–0
 Kathy May 4–0
/ Jana Novotná 3–0
 Nathalie Tauziat 3–0
 Andrea Temesvári 3–0
 Lori McNeil 3–2
 Katerina Maleeva 2–0
 Conchita Martínez 2–0
 Kristien Shaw 2–0
// Monica Seles 2–1
 Barbara Paulus 1–1
 Arantxa Sánchez Vicario 1–1
/ Natasha Zvereva 1–1

125-match clay court winning streak from August 1973 to May 1979

 1973:
US Clay Court Championships, IN. (d. Pat Bostrom 6–0 6–0; Isabel Fernandez 6–3 6–4; Pat Pretorius 6–2 6–1; Linda Tuero 6–0 6–0; Veronica Burton 6–4 6–3 in final);
Columbus, GA. (d. Janet Haas 6–1 6–0; Francoise Durr 6–0 6–2; Laurie Fleming 6–4 6–0; Rosie Casals 6–3 7–6; won by default over Margaret Court – defaults not counted as matches in streak);
Virginia Slims Championships, Boca Raton, FL. (d. Kristien Kemmer-Shaw 6–2 6–3; Karen Krantzcke 6–0 6–0; Julie Heldman 6–2 6–4; Kerry Melville 6–1 6–2; Nancy Richey 6–3 6–3 in final)
 1974:
Ft. Lauderdale, FL. (d. Laurie Fleming 6–1 6–2; Wendy Overton 6–0 6–3; Betty Stove 6–3 6–4; Rose Casals 6–0 6–1; won by default over Kerry Melville);
Sarasota, FL. (d. Carrie Meyer 6–1 6–2; Sue Stap 6–1 6–1; Betty Stove 6–0 6–1; Olga Morozova 6–2 6–0; Evonne Goolagong 6–4 6–0 in final);
St. Petersburg, FL. (d. Pat Bostrom 6–0 6–1; Glynis Coles 6–1 6–3; Karen Krantzcke 6–7 6–0 6–0; Helga Masthoff 6–1 6–1; Kerry Melville 6–0 6–1 in final);
Family Circle Cup, SC. (d. Kerry Harris 6–1 6–2; Wendy Overton def.; Betty Stove 6–2 6–3; Rosie Casals 6–1 6–0; Kerry Melville 6–1 6–3 in final);
Italian Open, Rome (d. Lita Sugiarto 7–5 6–2; Marie Neumannova 4–6 6–1 6–4; Kazuko Sawamatsu 6–1 6–1; Olga Morozova 6–1 1–6 6–0; Martina Navratilova 6–3 6–3 in final);
French Open, Paris (d. Regina Marsikova 6–1 6–4; Virginia Ruzici 6–2 6–3; Vicky Baldovinos 6–2 6–2; Julie Heldman 6–0 7–5; Helga Masthoff 7–5 6–4; Olga Morozova 6–1 6–2 in final);
US Clay Court Championships, IN. (d. Helle Sparre 6–0 6–0; Roberta Stark 6–2 6–2; Virginia Ruzici 6–0 6–1; Carrie Meyer 6–1 6–2; Gail Chanfreau 6–0 6–0 in final);
Canadian Open, Toronto (d. Maria Nasuelli 6–1 6–2; Gail Chanfreau 6–0 6–2; Laurie Tenney 6–0 6–0; Kazuko Sawamatsu 6–0 6–1; Julie Heldman 6–0 6–3 in final)
1975:
Family Circle Cup, FL. (d. Carrie Meyer 6–0 6–0; Rosie Casals 6–1 6–0; Francoise Durr 6–2 6–0; Evonne Goolagong 6–1 6–1; Martina Navratilova 7–5 6–4 in final);
Italian Open, Rome (d. Rosalba Vido 6–0 6–2; Sue Barker 6–1 6–3; Fiorella Bonicelli 6–1 6–3; Mima Jausovec 6–2 6–0; Martina Navratilova 6–1 6–0 in final);
French Open, Paris (d. Carmen Perea 6–2 6–2; Mima Jausovec 6–2 6–3; Renata Tomanova 6–3 6–2; Kazuko Sawamatsu 6–2 6–2; Olga Morozova 6–4 6–0; Martina Navratilova 2–6 6–2 6–1 in final);
US Clay Court Championships, IN. (d. Paulina Peisachov 6–0 6–2; Glynis Coles 6–2 6–0; Donna Ganz 6–1 6–2; Nancy Richey 6–7 7–5 4–2 ret. Evert recovered from 7–6 5–0 40–15 down to win this match and keep streak alive at 73 matches; Dianne Fromholtz 6–3 6–4 in final);
Rye, NY.  (d. Gail Chanfreau 6–2 6–1; Mima Jausovec def.; Mona Schallau 6–0 6–4; Margaret Court 6–3 6–3; Virginia Wade 6–0 6–1 in final);
US Open, NY. (d. Lesley Hunt 6–1 6–0; Natasha Chmyreva 6–0 6–3; Wendy Overton 6–0 6–1; Kerry Melville 6–2 6–1; Martina Navratilova 6–4 6–4; Evonne Goolagong 5–7 6–4 6–2 in final);
Orlando, FL. (d. Janet Newberry 6–1 6–2; Isabel Fernandez 6–1 6–4; Linky Boshoff 6–2 6–2; Rosie Casals 6–0 6–2; Martina Navratilova def. in final);
World Invitational, SC. (d. Rosie Casals 6–0 6–1; Evonne Goolagong 6–1 6–1 in final)
1976:
Family Circle Cup, FL.  (d. Wendy Turnbull 6–2 6–1; Torry Ann Fretz 6–0 6–0; Betty Stove 6–4 6–4; Mary Struthers 6–0 6–0; Kerry Melville-Reid 6–2 6–2 in final);
US Open, NY.  (d. Greer Stevens 6–1 6–0; Glynis Coles 6–0 6–0; Sue Barker 6–1 6–0; Natasha Chmyreva 6–1 6–2; Mima Jausovec 6–3 6–1; Evonne Goolagong 6–3 6–0 in final)
1977:
Family Circle Cup, SC. (d. Bunny Bruning 6–0 6–3; Wendy Turnbull 6–1 6–0; Kath May 6–0 6–1; Mima Jausovec 6–3 6–3; Billie Jean King 6–0 6–1 in final);
US Open, NY.  (d. Sharon Walsh 6–1 6–0; Pam Whytcross 6–0 6–0; Helena Anliot 6–2 6–2; Nancy Richey 6–3 6–0; Billie Jean King 6–2 6–0; Betty Stove 6–3 7–5; Wendy Turnbull 7–6 6–2 in final)
1978:
Family Circle Cup, SC.  (d. Beth Norton 6–1 6–0; Mima Jausovec 6–0 6–1; Renee Richards 6–4 6–3; Tracy Austin 6–3 6–1; Kerry Melville-Reid 6–2 6–0 in final)
1979:
Fed Cup, Madrid (d. Sylvia Hanika 6–4 6–2; Brigitte Simon 6–0 6–0; Olga Morozova 6–4 8–6; Dianne Fromholtz 2–6 6–3 8–6);
Italian Open, Rome (d. JoAnne Russell 6–1 6–2; Janet Newberry 6–2 6–1; Ivanna Madruga 3–6 6–1 6–4; lost semi-final to Tracy Austin 4–6 6–2 6–7(4–7))

Statistics: 71 of the 258 sets (or 28%) were 6–0.  Only 8 of the 125 matches were three-setters. From the beginning of this run, Evert did not lose a set on clay in 1973 or between 1976 and 1978. She had runs of 76, 65, and 50 consecutive sets won during the streak.

See also
 Evert–Navratilova rivalry

References

External links 
 
 
 
 

Statistics
Tennis career statistics